The Success Automobile Manufacturing Company was a brass era United States automobile manufacturer, located at 532 De Ballviere Avenue, St. Louis, Missouri, in 1906.

Business concentrated on building high wheeler automobiles, mainly buggies.

The company 
The Success Automobile Manufacturing Company was founded in 1906 by John C. Higdon, who had built his first car in 1896; back then for experimental purposes only. Production started with a price of US$250 which was exceedingly low, even for high wheelers. It is the lowest nominal that a new car has ever been sold for, even lower than $260 Ford T in 1925. Later models became slightly more complex, and expensive. While Success always stayed with highwheelers, they got a twin cylinder engine in 1908 (singles being dropped at the end of that year), built a commercial car in 1908 only, and offered several new models in 1909, among them their only four-cylinder car. Two- and four cylinder engines were available with water or air cooling.

While Higdon was open to let people copy his construction back in 1896, and even publicly invited to do so, he became much more aware of patents and royalties when building cars on a commercial schedule. So, he took several competitors to court on this matter; among them the Economy Motor Buggy Company in Fort Wayne, Indiana, and the W. H. Kiblinger Company in Auburn, Indiana (a predecessor of the Auburn Automobile Company). Although, the Success Automobile Manufacturing Company folded before the end of this litigations.

It is estimated, that Success built ca. 600 vehicles.

Success Models A and B 

Success never offered models other than high wheelers. The initial Model A featured an air-cooled single cylinder gasoline engine of 3 x 3 in. bore and stroke, giving a capacity of 21,21 c.i. or 347.5 cm³, and delivered 2 to 3 HP., steel tires (rubber was available, for US$25 extra), and a 2-speed planetary transmission brought power via a single 
chain to a sprocket on the right rear wheel only. The engine was placed under the car, on the right side below the driver's seat. Front wheels had a diameter of 37 in. (940 mm), rear wheels of 41 in. (1041 mm).

It claimed speeds of 4-18 mph (6.5–29 km/h) and mileage of 100mpg (4.25 L/100 km).

A slightly improved Model B followed in 1907 with a 4 HP single cylinder engine.

Models C, D, E, and F 
Also in 1908, a slightly more sophisticated high wheeler came with the 2-cylinder Model C. Its engine delivered 10 HP, and the vehicle got a longer wheelbase. 1908 brought two more horsepower to the Model C, and a choice of bodywork, including the first Success commercial car. In 1909, the final year of its existence, the single cylinder model was dropped, as were the additional body styles for the Model C. Instead, new models were introduced: Model D, a Surrey that offered more power and a longer wheelbase for less money than the previous C variant, Model E which was a more comfortable runabout than the C, offering more power and the longest wheelbase of all Success cars (96 in. / 2438 mm), and finally a car that was not to be expected by this manufacturer: A four-cylinder sports car with an output of 24 HP.

Success model range 

Models A and B: air cooled; all others: choice of air or water cooling.

Market 
High wheelers had a unique market. They were bought mainly in the countryside where consumers were skeptical of the automobile.

So, these cars had to be simple, easy to maintain and repair, and inexpensive. Sophistication was no criterion. Normally, they were offered at prices around $350 bis 450, as the Black for $375. With a price tag of $250, the Success Model A was one of the cheapest and simplest automobiles available in the U.S. at that time.

Later Success vehicles competed with slightly more sophisticated high wheelers, as offered by the Auto-Bug Company ($850), or the George White Buggy.

Still, one has to keep in mind that few automobile manufacturers had yet a nationwide representative network, or even sold their products in the whole country. Car building was often a local business, and for this, comparisons are difficult. Comparing them with "real" or conventional automobiles is still another challenge, as their building methods, and their construction differed because of their different tasks.

The best-selling American car of the early 1900s was the Oldsmobile Curved Dash that cost $650 through its whole production run, but was nearly as outdated in 1906 as the Success was when introduced: Both had no front mounted engine, and no shaft drive, the latter becoming standard at least for smaller cars very soon and both had single cylinder engines while even most high wheelers used twin, and Ford introduced with its Model N, a four-cylinder, for only $500 in 1907.

See also 
List of defunct United States automobile manufacturers

Notes

References
Clymer, Floyd. Treasury of Early American Automobiles, 1877-1925 (New York: Bonanza Books, 1950).
Kimes, Beverly Rae (editor) and Clark, Henry Austin jr.: The Standard Catalogue of American Cars 1805-1942, 3rd ed., Krause Publications, Iola WI 54990, USA (1996),  .
Kimes, Beverly Rae: Pioneers, Engineers, and Scoundrels: The Dawn of the Automobile in America. edited by SAE (Society of Automotive Engineers) Permissions, Warrendale PA 2005,  (Hardcover).

External links
american-automobiles.com: Success, retrieved 16 Jan., 2014

Brass Era vehicles
Defunct motor vehicle manufacturers of the United States
1900s cars
Highwheeler